Insônia is a 2012 Brazilian romantic comedy film directed by Beto Souza, based on the book of the same name by Marcelo Carneiro da Cunha.

The film was shot in 2007 and was only completed in 2012, premiered at the Festival de Gramado. The film was released theatrically in Brazil in 2014.

References

External links

2012 films
Brazilian romantic comedy films
2012 romantic comedy films